Palaina dohrni is a species of minute land snail with an operculum, a terrestrial gastropod mollusk or micromollusks in the family Diplommatinidae. This species is endemic to Palau.

References

D
Endemic fauna of Palau
Molluscs of Oceania
Molluscs of the Pacific Ocean
Taxonomy articles created by Polbot